Tobia Giuseppe Loriga (born 1 March 1977) is an Italian professional boxer. He is also the former Italy and IBF International Light Middleweight Champion.

Professional career
On 26 April 2008 Tobia Giuseppe Loriga lost by ninth round KO to Julio César Chávez, Jr.

References

External links

People from Crotone
Welterweight boxers
Light-middleweight boxers
1978 births
Living people
Italian male boxers
Sportspeople from the Province of Crotone